3 in 8, which in Catalan is called 3 de 8, is a castellers human tower with 8 levels and 3 people per level in the trunk, except for the last three levels called the top crown ( in Catalan), which, like in most other castells, consists of the pair, a bending child and the crowner.  One of the pairs, called the right pair, stands on the shoulder of a casteller of the fifth level, completing the main row usually called , while the other pair, called open pair, stands with its legs open with one foot in each of the other castellers shoulder. The other two rows are called the right and left rows ( and ), or the full and empty rows ( and ). The bending child climbs up through the left/empty row, while the crowner and the open pair climb up through the right/full row. Once crowned, the crowner climbs down using the main row.

References

External links

Castellers
Catalan folklore